Blue House refers to a 4-storey balcony-type tenement block located at 72-74A Stone Nullah Lane, Wan Chai, Hong Kong. It is named after the blue colour painted on its external walls. It is one of the few remaining examples of tong lau of the balcony type in Hong Kong and is listed as a Grade I historic building.

Historic background
The building was the original site of the first hospital 'Wah To Hospital' (aka "Wan Chai Kai Fong Hospital"), which was built in the 1870s in Wan Chai. The hospital, which provided Chinese medical services to local Chinese, was possibly the first hospital in the district.

After the hospital closed in 1886, the two-storey building was then used as a temple for Wah To, the revered Chinese physician from the Three Kingdoms period.

The building was demolished in 1920 and was built into four four-storey tenement blocks in 1922. After the Japanese occupation of Hong Kong in 1945. The building was subsequently used as a martial arts school and Dit Da clinic by Lam Cho, the adopted nephew of Lam Sai-wing.

The building was acquired by the government in the 1970s, and in 1990 the outer walls were painted blue, thus earning it the name Blue House.

Future revitalisation
All the upper floors of Blue House, apart from 72 Stone Nullah Lane, are timber structures. The two wooden stairs, with original elements intact, are well maintained.

The building was part of a HK$100 million plan, unveiled by the Housing Society and the Urban Renewal Authority, to preserve nine Chinese-style buildings in Wan Chai that were constructed during the 1920s.

The building has been preserved and revitalised in a traditional tea and medicine style.

In 2007, the Urban Renewal Authority and the Development Bureau jointly announced that the residents of the Blue House, were to be allowed to stay in this historic monument. On the same year, one of the ground floor's shophouses of the building was occupied as a location of the Wan Chai Livelihood Place, which was later renamed as the Hong Kong House of Stories in March 2012. The building closed for renovation in 2015.

The building was fully renovated and opened in 2016. It won the 2017/2018 architectural prize in 2018.

Neighbourhood 
The building is located on the corner of Stone Nullah Lane, King Sing Street and Hing Wan Street. Stone Nullah Street connects to Queen’s Road East facing Old Wan Chai Market Building. 85 Stone Nullah Lane is the headquarters and community centre of  St James Settlement (Hong Kong).

A non-profit community art space called Wan Chai Visual Archive was located in a tenement building at 9 Hing Wan Street.  It was initiated by the building’s owner Goldig Investment Group 協利集團 and Hong Kong Polytechnic University. Carl Gouw 吳家耀, representing the owner was its director and Alvin Yip was curator. Alvin Yip was director of the Jockey Club Design Institute for Social Innovation of Hong Kong Polytechnic University, and received the Ten Outstanding Young Persons Award in 2011. Carl Gouw and Alvin Yip were both directors of non-profit Hong Kong Ambassadors of Design.

Wan Chai Visual Archive was opened in 2012 to the public with a ceremony attended by Salina Yan, Deputy Secretary for Home Affairs and James Settlement‘s CEO. It held exhibitions and events attended by government officials, consulate generals, entertainment celebrities, local, international artists and students.  It encouraged the engagements of public and business sectors, non-profit organizations and the neighbourhood in the process of cultural and heritage preservation.

The project is mentioned in the book ‘Urbanizing Carescapes of Hong Kong ‘ by Shu-mei Huang who wrote ‘By breaking their exercises of redevelopment into different components and phases, the operation could accumulate cultural capital for their future projects.’

See also
 Green House (Hong Kong)
 Revitalising Historic Buildings Through Partnership Scheme
 Wan Chai Heritage Trail

References

External links

 Preliminary Study on "Blue House"

Grade I historic buildings in Hong Kong
Monuments and memorials in Hong Kong
Residential buildings in Hong Kong
Wan Chai